Bhopatpura is a village in Reengus, Sikar district, Rajasthan, India.

External links  
Google Map

Villages in Sikar district